Rummi is a village in Võru Parish, Võru County, in southeastern Estonia.

References

 

Võru Parish
Villages in Võru County